Zamin Shahi (also Romanized as Zamīn Shāhī; also known as Zamīn Shāh) is a village in Qaleh Qafeh Rural District, in the Central District of Minudasht County, Golestan Province, Iran. At the 2006 census, its population was 260, in 59 families.

References 

Populated places in Minudasht County